The Californian Journal of Health Promotion is a peer-reviewed medical journal focusing on health education and health promotion practice, teaching, research, and issues of interest to professionals in California and the surrounding Western United States. The journal publishes multimedia presentations  along with traditional scholarly manuscripts. It is indexed in CINAHL. As of September 2021, it has suspended all peer review activities.

The journal was established in 2003 by Mark Tomita, an  expert on the  integration of technology into public health.

Article types published include:
Editorials
Professional Practice
Theory and Research
The Health Educator Experience -  case studies of health educator, retired health educator, and health education student experiences in the field. 
Professional Updates

Editor 
Previously, the editor in chief was Jie Weiss (California State University, Fullerton).

References

External links
 

Publications established in 2003
Public health journals